Robert Hales is a graphic designer and music video director from the United Kingdom.  Hales has directed music videos by artists such as Westlife, Bridgit Mendler, Avril Lavigne, Tame Impala, Jet, The Veronicas, Fuel, Stereophonics, The Donnas, Justin Timberlake, Nine Inch Nails, Death Cab For Cutie, Miley Cyrus, Gnarls Barkley, Imagine Dragons and Crowded House.  Robert Hales has co-directed the video for Nine Inch Nails' "Starfuckers, Inc.", but he designed the artwork for the CD single of Nine Inch Nails' "The Day the World Went Away."

On 31 August 2006 Hales received an MTV Video Music Award for directing the Gnarls Barkley single "Crazy".

Robert Hales directed the video to "Kiss You Off" by the Scissor Sisters.
Also, Hales directed the groundbreaking music video for Justin Timberlake's "LoveStoned" and Britney Spears' animated video for "Break The Ice". Also, in 2012, has directed the video to "Look Around" by the Red Hot Chili Peppers.

Filmography

References

External links

Robert Hales at Clipland

Biography and Work @ Mothership
Robert Hales at Warp
Biography and Work @ HSI Productions
Biography and Work @ HSI London
Videos by Robert Hales

British graphic designers
British music video directors
Living people
Year of birth missing (living people)